The 2011 NACAM Rally Championship was the 4th season of the FIA's NACAM Rally Championship. This Championship is the FIA rally championship for the North America and Central America region.

Report

The season began in Mazamitla, Mexico. Raúl Orlandini took the first victory and took the first place in the championship. Orlandini won the first five special stage. Rubén Cuenca won the last, but only finished second. Orlandini won the second race in Puebla. Orlandini won four special stages, Luis Miguel Abascal won the fourth, and Víctor Pérez the fifth. Abascal finished in second place. The third round of NRC was carried out in Jacó, Costa Rica. The local driver José Andrés Montalto won the rally, but he was ineligible to NRC. The second place Orlandini took the points for first place. Nicolás Fuchs took the victory in the fourth rally, Rally Órganos. Roberto Cuenca finished in 3th place in the rally, but 1st in NRC. However the Peruvian driver, Orlandini was proclaimed champion in this round.

Drivers

Calendar

Results and standings

Results

Driver's Championship
Points are awarded to the top 10 classified finishers.  The best 4 of a driver's results count towards the championship.

References

NACAM Rally Championship
NACAM Rally Championship
NACAM Rally Championship
NACAM Rally Championship